The 2012 Wilmington mayoral election was held on Tuesday, November 6, 2012, to elect the mayor of Wilmington, Delaware. Incumbent mayor James Baker was ineligible to run again because of term limits.

Democratic Party primaries were held on September 11, 2012, and won by Dennis P. Williams.  Williams faced a write-in campaign from Kevin Melloy in the general election. Williams won the general election.

Democratic primary

Candidates
 Robert Bovell, bail bondsman
 Kevin Kelley, City Councilman
 Bill Montgomery, chief of staff to Mayor Baker
 Scott Spencer, transportation consultant
 Dennis P. Williams, state Representative for the 1st district

Withdrew
 Paul Calistro, Jr., nonprofit director
 Selara Gatewood
 Derrick Johnson, pastor
 Robert Marshall, state Senator for the 3rd district

Results

Republican primary

Candidates

Disqualified from ballot, running as write-in candidate
 Kevin Melloy, real estate agent

Withdrew
 Mike Brown, City Councilman

General election

Candidates
Dennis P. Williams (D), state Representative for the 1st district

Results

References

External links
 Robert Bovell for Mayor
 Kevin Kelley for Mayor
 Bill Montgomery for Mayor
 Scott Spencer for Mayor
 Dennis Williams for Mayor

Wilmington Mayor
Wilmington
Wilmington Mayor 2012
Elections Mayor 2012